Eric I, the Elder (16 February 1470 – 30 July 1540) was Duke of Brunswick-Lüneburg from 1495 and the first reigning prince of Calenberg-Göttingen.

Life and works

Ancestry 
Eric I was born on 16 February 1470 in Neustadt am Rübenberge at the castle of Rovenburg.
He was the founder of the Calenberg line of the House of Brunswick-Lüneburg. His father, William II, died in 1503, but had already divided his lands in 1495, between his sons, Henry and Eric. Eric was given the Principalities of Calenberg and Göttingen, whilst Henry received the Principality of Brunswick-Wolfenbüttel. Even as a boy, Eric had travelled as a pilgrim to Jerusalem and toured Italy before he entered the service of Emperor Maximilian I.

In the service of the emperor 

Even in his early years Eric had proved himself as a brave fighter at the side of the emperors and took part in 1497 in the campaign against the Turks. Later he fought in wars against Venice, the Swiss confederation and France. In the Bavarian-Landshut war in 1504 he saved the emperor's life at the Battle of Regensburg the Leben, whereupon he was knighted.

Eric I was the second son of Duke William II of Brunswick-Wolfenbüttel (d 1503) and received in 1491, before his father died, his inheritance of the Principality of Calenberg-Göttingen. His elder brother, Duke Henry the Elder (1463–1514) was given rule over Brunswick-Wolfenbüttel. In 1505 the 35-year-old Duke Eric I of Calenberg made Neustadt am Rübenberge his second seat of power.

When the first marriage of the duke to the widow of Archduke Sigismund of Austria, Katharina of Saxony, proved childless, he married after her death on 7 July 1525 the 15-year-old Elisabeth of Brandenburg. From this marriage resulted his long-awaited successor Eric II (1528–1584). When, in 1528, Elisabeth fell ill in bed when she was pregnant, she held the witchcraft of her husband's mistress, Anna Rumschottel, responsible. She persuaded her husband to hold a trial. In the process, several women were burned to death, but the duke allowed his mistress to escape. She was however burnt to death in Hamelin.

During the Hildesheim Diocesan Feud (1519–1523) he captured Hunnesrück Castle in 1521, together with Henry the Younger of Wolfenbüttel. It lay on a hill near the present town district of Hunnesrück in Dassel. He bombarded the castle with heavy cannon from the hill of Hatop. He gave the castle up after a short period however. Between 1527 and 1530, he had the castle of Erichsburg built in a marshy depression about 3 km further east which was protected by a wide moat and high ramparts. It was named after his heir, born in 1528, later Duke Eric II. Eric I used it from time to time as his seat of office. Whilst it was being built he lived in the old castle at Hunnesrück.

After the feud, the Amt of Kolding and Poppenburg were transferred to Duke Eric I in accordance with the requirements of the Quedlinburg Recess. In 1523 abbey parish of St. Andrew in Derneburg placed itself under the protection of Eric I of Calenberg, because it had been repeatedly plundered by the knights of Duke Henry II of Brunswick-Lüneburg.

In 1529 Eric allowed the town of Hanover to hold an annual Schützenfest ("shooting festival"), which today has become the Hanover Schützenfest, the largest of its kind in the world. In 1530 he took Aerzen back into the possession of the Welfs (his coat of arms is over the door in the north wing of the castle).

In 1539 Eric I united the former Ämter of Hunnesrück, Lüthorst and Lauenberg into the new Amt of Erichsburg which remained in that form until 1643.

In 1540, just under 23 years after the Martin Luther's posting of his theses, Duke Eric I of Calenberg-Göttingen died. His son, Eric II, was still a child, which is why his mother, the Duchess Elisabeth, took over the reign for five years. Two years earlier she had publicly allowed communion to be taken in both kinds in a church service. From then on she and her husband followed separate confessions: the duke remained Roman Catholic, the duchess became Lutheran.

Duke Eric I died on 30 July 1540 at the Reichstag in Haguenau, Alsace. He left behind large debts, estimated at 900,000 thalers, as well as two important buildings: the Erichsburg near Dassel and the rebuilt Calenberg Castle. His funeral took place in 1541 in Hann. Münden's St. Blasius Church, after his body was released in Haguenau one year after his death on payment of his debts. This required every subject in his duchy to pay 16 pfennigs.

Offspring 
Duke Eric had a son and three daughters by his second wife, Elisabeth of Brandenburg:

 Elisabeth (b 8 April 1526; d 19 August 1566) m (1543) Count George Ernest of Henneberg (1511–1583)
 Eric II, Duke of Brunswick-Calenberg (b 10 August 1528; d 17 November 1584)
m (1545–1573) Sidonie of Saxony (b 8 March 1518; d 4 January 1575), daughter of Henry of Saxony and Catherine of Mecklenburg
m (1576) Dorothea of Lorraine (b 24. August 1545; d 2 June 1621), daughter of Francis I of Lorraine and Christina of Denmark
 Anna Maria (b 23 April 1532; d 20 March 1568) m (1550) Albert the Elder, Margrave of Brandenburg-Ansbach, Duke of Prussia (1490–1568)
 Katharina (b 1534; d 10 May 1559) m (1557) William of Rosenberg, Senior Burgrave (Oberburggraf) of Bohemia (1535–1592)

Ancestors

References

Sources 

 
 
 Wolfgang Kunze: Herzog Erich I. von Braunschweig-Lüneburg. In: Wolfgang Kunze (Hg.): Leben und Bauten Herzog Erichs II. von Braunschweig-Lüneburg. Catalogue of the historic exhibition at Landestrost Castle, Neustadt am Rübenberge. Hanover 1993, p. 31–45.
 Joachim Lehrmann: Hexenverfolgung in Hannover-Calenberg und Calenberg-Göttingen, Lehrte, 2005.

External links 
 Picture and short description of the life of Duke Eric with his second wife, Elisabeth on the official pages of the house of Welf.
 Coins from his reign
 Historic picture of the Ericsburg

|-

|-

Princes of Calenberg
Princes of Göttingen
Princes of Wolfenbüttel
1470 births
1540 deaths
Middle House of Brunswick
Military personnel from Lower Saxony